Vellai Pookal is a 2019 Indian Tamil language neo-noir crime thriller film directed by newcomer Vivek Elangovan. The film stars Vivekh, Charle, Pooja Devariya, Dev and Paige Henderson, and is produced by Indus Creations, an arts group based in Seattle. The film was released on 19 April 2019, a day after the start of the 2019 Indian general election.

Plot 

The film moves ahead through two parallel storylines, one involving a small girl who is held captive in a farmhouse along with her mother and abused by her father. Her mother is bedridden in a paralyzed state, and hence, the two are unable to escape, while the father is involved in the drug and flesh trades.

In Chennai, Rudhran Ganesan is a Deputy Inspector General Of Police in Crime Branch, who has a knack for solving crimes, whilst observing the crime scenes and imagining himself in the criminal's shoes to deduce how the crimes occurred. He solves the murder of a small family as his last case and retires from the Police by age. He has distanced himself from his son Ajay, as the latter married his lover against Rudhran's wishes. It is later revealed that Ajay had informed of this love two days prior to his marriage date, thus causing humiliation to Rudhran. Now retired, Rudhran comes to Seattle to spend time with Ajay upon insistence by the Police Commissioner, Manimaran. Both Rudhran and Ajay are people who have not spoken much in three years, and they try to bury the hatchet. Rudhran also does not want to talk to Ajay's American wife, Alice Harlin. While Rudhran visits Seattle to solve the family hurdles, he comes across certain strange events involving his new neighbours.

Initially, he rubbishes them off and tries to blend in the new atmosphere, with some help from Bharatidasan and his daughter Ramya, the latter of which is also Ajay's colleague. One day, while Ajay and Rudhran are out on a day trip to explore the city, one of his neighbours goes missing. Almost immediately, Rudhran's police instincts kick in, although he is warned by the local police to stay away from the investigation. Ajay too reprimands Rudhran for getting involved, reminding him that he is retired. However, his instincts refuse to give in. Rudhran secretly inspects the house of the missing neighbour and almost gets caught for the same. The same night, he encounters another young boy named Carlos, in the neighborhood, who subsequently goes missing. The neighbours, including Ramya's mother, stereotypically blame a few seemingly shady people for the kidnappings, including a Pakistani national and a black man.

Rudhran refuses to believe these stereotypes and thinks like a cop would, often dragging Bharathi into his personal investigations. During a conversation regarding the case, Ramya angrily leaves the dining table, and Rudhran learns of her sad past. Apologizing to Bharathi, Rudhran continues to investigate the case of the kidnappings. One day, Rudhran leaves early with Bharathi to inspect a crime scene, it is when he has his first conversation with Alice. Previously, he had a verbal altercation with Ajay regarding the latter's marriage. Ajay refused to talk to Rudhran after that. A couple of days later, Ajay goes missing. Now, Rudhran is caught in an emotional turmoil. He has to battle his cop instincts and deal with his emotions as a father. Based on some suspicions, Rudhran and Bharathi tail the black man to a far off warehouse. Unfortunately, both are caught by the perpetrators, but thankfully, Bharathi had dialled 911 before blacking out, thus enabling both of them to be saved in time.

While leaving from there, Rudhran finds the body of Mona (first victim), and this creates a new twist in the tale. At the precinct, Rudhran and Bharathi realize that someone is trying to throw them off the trail of the case, thus indicating that they are nearing the criminal. Following another hunch, Rudhran goes to the house of the Pakistani national, Majid, but finds out that the only thing Majid can be accused of is giving shelter to Syrian refugees, whom Majid was trying to protect; lest they be branded as terrorists. Then, Rudhran realizes that Ajay went missing on a Wednesday, the day that garbage gets collected in their neighborhood every week. Following this lead, they rush to the garbage dump, but it turns out to be a dead end. After some more pondering, Rudhran rushes to Bharathi's house and asks Bharathi to call Ramya, who has gone to drop Alice, but neither of them picks up the call.

Rudhran rushes with Bharathi to Odessa, claiming that Ajay is held up there. It is only then revealed that the small girl in the parallel storyline and Alice are one and the same, with the other storyline being a flashback. 12 years ago, the teenager Nicole Burke loses her mother and decides to step up to her abusive father and shoots him dead. Nicole's vengeance grows with her, and she slowly takes revenge on all those who wronged her during her childhood. Growing up, Nicole changed her name to Alice and worked as a child care consultant in schools to make sure no other child suffers her fate. It is revealed that Mona used to abuse kids who came to her photo studio for taking pictures, and Carlos used to take obscene videos of other students in his school after drugging them. Alice/Nicole got rid of them. Rudhran deduces that Alice/Nicole has killed many people in the past, many of who have committed such crimes and gotten away with it.

Ajay is the only positive thing that seemed to have happened in Alice's life. While usually quiet with others, Alice slowly warms up to Ajay, and the two eventually get married. On the night of the verbal altercation with Rudhran, Ajay notices Alice's childhood photo in a missing person's report on TV and gets surprised. The next day, Ajay goes to Odessa and sees Alice chopping up someone. It is where he comes in contact with the dandelions that give him a rash, the same kind of rash were found on Mona's body. Shocked at this revelation about Alice, Ajay waits for her to return home and confronts her. Afraid of losing Ajay, Alice comes back from work the next day without informing anyone, in a black pickup truck and kidnaps Ajay. The truck is spotted by the garbage collector, and he conveys the same to Ramya, who was having Rudhran's phone, thus forcing Alice/Nicole to kidnap Ramya as well. Cut to the present, Alice has Rudhran and Bharathi at gunpoint and instructs her dog to guard them while she tries to escape with Ajay.

Rudhran successfully evades the dog and goes out to stop Alice, who desperately tries to start her pick up truck (Rudhran has earlier blocked its exhaust to prevent her from escaping). While Rudhran tries to calm Alice, Ajay comes to his senses, and Alice finally drops her gun. The movie ends with the police arriving at the scene and a voice-over by Rudhran indicating that we need to step up against child abuse and let the Vellai Pookal (dandelions) bloom independently.

Cast 
Vivekh as Rudhran
V. T. M. Charle as Bharatidasan 
Pooja Devariya as Ramya 
Dev as Ajay  
Paige Henderson as Alice Harlin / Nicole Burke  
Gabrielle Castronover as young Nicole Burke
Lionel Flynn as Ethan
Gajaraj as DIG
Sudha Rajasekaran as Meena 
Anny Havland as Mona
Micheal Horstman as Carlos
Mohammed Firaz as Majid

Production 
Vellaipookal was filmed in multiple locations in the Seattle metropolitan area, including WNP-3 and WNP-5 (more commonly known as the Satsop Nuclear Plant), as well as in Chennai.

Soundtrack 

The soundtrack of the film was composed by Ramgopal Krishnaraju, with all lyrics written by Madhan Karky. The music rights were acquired by Muzik 247.

Release 
The film was released on 19 April 2019. The movie was well received by critics and audiences alike upon its release. Vivek's performance was highly praised, with many praising his departure from his traditional comical roles. Anantha Vikatan rated the film 43 out of 100, saying that it was on par with its contemporary hits Dhuruvangal Pathinaaru and Ratsasan.

Awards and nominations

References

External links 

 Vellaipookal (aka) Vellai Pookal Movie review. Behindwoods. 19 April 2019

2019 films
2010s Tamil-language films
Indian drama films
Indian action films
Indian thriller films
Indian mystery films
Indian police films
Films shot in the United States
2019 crime thriller films